Anthony Crisostomo "Tony" Blaz (September 22, 1958 – January 30, 2016) was a Guamanian politician previously served a total of five terms as a Senator in the Guam Legislature and was chosen by his colleagues to serve as Vice Speaker of the 24th and 25th Guam Legislatures, respectively.

Biography

Early life 
Blaz was born and raised on Guam and he's the son of Joaquin Garrido Blaz and the late Brigida Lujan Crisostomo. He has 6 siblings including his brothers Joaquin C. Blaz, Matthew Blaz and his sisters Alicia Bethune, Amanda McHenry, Ann Marie Blaz and Monica Wintterle, also he is also the nephew of the late Congressman Vicente "Ben" Blaz. 
He graduated in 1976 from Father Dueñas Memorial High School in Mangilao, Guam. He received his bachelor's degree in business administration from the University of Notre Dame and his master's degree in public administration from the University of Guam. He worked in accounting and in energy conservation.

Career 
Blaz served in the Guam Legislature. He served as director of the Guam Department of Administration.

Notes

1958 births
2016 deaths
Guamanian businesspeople
Guamanian Republicans
University of Notre Dame alumni
University of Guam alumni
Members of the Legislature of Guam